Fatima in Lucia's Own Words II (also known as Sister Lucia's Memoirs II) is a 2000 book by Sister Lúcia of Fátima (O.C.D.) and contains the 5th and 6th memoirs of the last surviving seer of the 1917 Virgin Mary apparitions in Cova da Iria, Fátima, Portugal. This book is the second of two volumes: the Fifth Memoir is about her father, while the Sixth Memoir is about her mother. The book also contains several pictures of her family home, including interior rooms, and pictures of brothers, sisters and parents, and drawings showing the layout of Lúcia's home, and the general layout of the property.

Edited by Father Louis Kondor, S.V.D., this book was translated into English language by the Dominican Nuns of the Perpetual Rosary and published by the Portuguese Postulation for the Three Little Shepherds of Fátima (Secretariado dos Pastorinhos).

See also 
 Fatima in Lucia's Own Words, volume 1 of the memoirs, 1976
 Calls from the Message of Fatima, 2005 book by Sister Lucia
 A Pathway Under the Gaze of Mary: Biography of Sister Maria Lucia of Jesus and the Immaculate Heart

References 

Our Lady of Fátima
Religious literature